('Big Day') is what Christmas is called in Bangladesh and the neighbouring eastern Indian state of West Bengal.

History
Christianity was brought to Bangladesh in the 16th century by Portuguese traders and missionaries. Christians in Bangladesh make up 0.03 percent of the population.

Celebrations
Christians in Bangladesh give gifts to each other and visit others on Christmas. Christmas is national holiday in Bangladesh. Kids receive money or toys from adults. In rural areas, banana trees and leaves are used for decoration. In cities, common Christmas decorations include Christmas trees, banners and balloons. Special events are held in hotels and Christmas specials are shown on TV. Traditional foods include Christmas cake, pitha, and cookies. Christians visit churches and make Christmas cakes. Churches are decorated with Christmas lights and a Christmas tree. Church choirs perform Bengali Christmas songs. Church-held Christmas Eve feasts are called  and hymns are called .

Christmas is also increasingly celebrated by other religions in Bangladesh, especially in urban areas of the country.

See also

Christmas
Christianity in Bangladesh
Christmas worldwide

References

Annual events in Bangladesh
Public holidays in Bangladesh
Christmas